Alphanumericals or alphanumeric characters are a combination of alphabetical and numerical characters. More specifically, they are the collection of Latin letters and Arabic digits. An alphanumeric code is an identifier made of alphanumeric characters.

Merriam-Webster suggests that the term "alphanumeric" may often additionally refer to other symbols, such as punctuation and mathematical symbols.

In the POSIX/C locale, there are either 36 (A–Z and 0–9, case insensitive) or 62 (A–Z, a–z and 0–9, case-sensitive) alphanumeric characters.

Subsets of alphanumeric used in human interfaces

When a string of mixed alphabets and numerals is presented for human interpretation, ambiguities arise. The most obvious is the similarity of the letters I, O and Q to the numbers 1 and 0. Therefore, depending on the application, various subsets of the alphanumeric were adopted to avoid misinterpretation by humans.

In passenger aircraft, aircraft seat maps and seats were designated by row number followed by column letter. For wide bodied jets, the seats can be 10 across, labeled ABC-DEFG-HJK. The letter I is skipped to avoid mistaking it as row number 1. In Vehicle Identification Number used by motor vehicle manufacturers, the letters I, O and Q are omitted for their similarity to 1 or 0.

Tiny embossed letters are used to label pins on an V.35/M34 electrical connector. The letters I, O, Q, S, and Z were dropped to ease eye strain with 1, 0, 5, 3,and 2. That subset is named the DEC Alphabet after the company that first used it.

For alphanumerics that are frequently handwritten, in addition to I and O, V is avoided because it looks  like U in cursive, and Z for its similarity to 2.

See also
 Alphanumeric brand names
 Alphanumeric shellcode
 Alphanumeric keyboard
 Binary-to-text encoding
 Mathematical Alphanumeric Symbols

References

Identifiers